is a railway station in the town of Kunimi, Fukushima, Japan operated by East Japan Railway Company (JR East).

Lines
Fujita Station is served by the Tōhoku Main Line, and is located 289.3 rail kilometers from the official starting point of the line at Tokyo Station.

Station layout
The station has one side platform and oneisland platform connected to the station building by a footbridge. The station has a Midori no Madoguchi staffed ticket office.

Platforms

History
Fujita Station opened on September 5, 1900. The station was absorbed into the JR East network upon the privatization of the Japanese National Railways (JNR) on April 1, 1987.

Passenger statistics
In fiscal 2018, the station was used by an average of 645 passengers daily (boarding passengers only).

Surrounding area
Kunimi Post Office
Kunimi town hall

See also
 List of Railway Stations in Japan

References

External links

  

Stations of East Japan Railway Company
Railway stations in Fukushima Prefecture
Tōhoku Main Line
Railway stations in Japan opened in 1900
Kunimi, Fukushima